Mayuran is a 2019 Indian Tamil drama film directed by Nandan Subbrayan. It stars Anjan Dev, Asmitha Dogra and Vela Ramamoorthy in the lead roles, alongside a cast featuring predominantly newcomers. Featuring music composed by Jerard Felix, the film began production in late 2018 and was released on 30 August 2019.

Cast
Anjan Dev as Segu
Ashmitha Dogra
Vela Ramamoorthy as Periyavar
Amudhavanan as Viji
Balaji Radhakrishnan as Muthukumaran
Anandasamy
Sashi

Production
The film marked the directorial debut of Nandan Subbrayan, an erstwhile assistant of director Bala. He chose to make a film based on the theme of drug trafficking taking place in men’s college hostels. The director revealed that he based parts of the story on his own experience of living in college dormitories. Rookie actor Anjan Dev was signed in the lead role, while Ashmitha, a graduate from National School of Drama who had acted in Bengali films, was selected to make her debut as the lead actress. Vela Ramamoorthy was signed to play a character with grey shades, while Balaji Radhakrishnan from theatre group Koothu-P-Pattarai and Sashi from Jharkhand were selected for other pivotal roles.  The film’s set in Chidambaram, and was shot in several locations, including Karaikal and Pondicherry.

Soundtrack
The film's soundtrack was composed by Jerald Felix.
"Nenjallam Pookirai" - Sathyaprakash
"Mazhai Saaral" - Sathyaprakash

Release
The film had a low profile opening across Tamil Nadu on 30 August 2019. In its review, The Times of India noted "Mayuran has good performances, but lacks an emotional connect and smart writing." A critic from Cinema Express wrote "inconsistent writing, unnecessary songs, convenient plot points, and a hero you can't quite root for make Mayuran a dull affair". Likewise, a reviewer from the Asian Age noted that "the film has an intriguing plot, but the problem lies with the screenplay."

References

External links

2019 films
2010s Tamil-language films
2019 drama films
Indian drama films